What Would You Do, Chums? is a 1939 British comedy film directed by John Baxter and starring Syd Walker, Jean Gillie, Cyril Chamberlain and Peter Gawthorne.
 It was made at Elstree Studios. The film's title was the popular catchphrase of comedian Syd Walker in BBC radio's Band Waggon series.

Cast
 Syd Walker as himself/narrator
 Jean Gillie as Lucy
 Cyril Chamberlain as Mike Collins
 Jack Barty as Joe Barker
 Wally Patch as Tom
 Gus McNaughton as Harry Piper
 Peter Gawthorne as Sir Douglas Gordon KC
 Julian Vedey as Mossy
 Arthur Finn as Slim Barton
 Andreas Malandrinos as Pop  
 Leonard Morris as Ernie Parsons  
 George Street as Inspector Wedge

References

Bibliography
 Low, Rachael. Filmmaking in 1930s Britain. George Allen & Unwin, 1985.
 Wood, Linda. British Films, 1927-1939. British Film Institute, 1986.

External links

1939 films
1939 comedy films
1930s English-language films
British comedy films
Films shot at Station Road Studios, Elstree
Films set in England
Films directed by John Baxter
British black-and-white films
1930s British films